William Murray Urquhart, known professionally as Billy Urquhart, (born 22 November 1956) is a Scottish former professional football player.

Early life 
Urquhart was born in Inverness, Scotland.

Career
Urquhart started his career at Inverness Caledonian but moved to Rangers in 1978. He stayed at the club for two years before moving on to Wigan Athletic for a season. Urquhart returned to Inverness with Caledonian in 1981 and stayed at the club until its amalgamation into Inverness Caledonian Thistle in 1994. He stayed at the newly formed club for one season before retiring.

Honors 
In 2019, Urquhart received a special Heritage Award from the Inverness Caledonian Thistle Hall of Fame.

References

Living people
Footballers from Inverness
Association football forwards
Wigan Athletic F.C. players
Rangers F.C. players
Inverness Caledonian Thistle F.C. players
Scottish footballers
1956 births
Scottish Football League players
English Football League players
Caledonian F.C. players
Association football midfielders
Highland Football League players